Our Father (Spanish: Padre nuestro) is a 1953 Mexican drama film directed by Emilio Gómez Muriel and starring Carlos López Moctezuma, Evita Muñoz ("Chachita") and Andrea Palma.

Cast

 Carlos López Moctezuma as Don Carlos Molina  
 Evita Muñoz ("Chachita") as Elisa Molina  
 Andrea Palma as Doña Adriana de Molina  
 Irma Dorantes as María Elena Molina  
 Miguel Córcega as Alberto  
 Raúl Farell as Federico Molina  
 Alberto Mariscal as Enrique Molina  
 Alfonso Mejía as Eduardo Molina  
 Luis Aceves Castañeda as El maestro  
 José Baviera as Miembro consejo banco  
 Alberto Carrière as El francés  
 Enrique Díaz 'Indiano' as Don Francisco Fernández  
 José Pidal as Miembro del consejo  
 Joaquín Roche as Empleado aserradero  
 José Luis Rojas as Antonio  
 Mario Sevilla as Comisario  
 Roberto Spriu as Doctor

References

Bibliography 
 María Luisa Amador. Cartelera cinematográfica, 1950-1959. UNAM, 1985.

External links 
 

1953 films
1953 drama films
Mexican drama films
1950s Spanish-language films
Films directed by Emilio Gómez Muriel
Mexican black-and-white films
1950s Mexican films